Mexico is an elimination-style dice game, in which several players agree to play a set number of rounds. After each round, one player is eliminated. When all players but one have been eliminated, the remaining player wins the game. Owing to its extremely simple play-structure, it is generally pursued as a method of gambling, whereby the final remaining player wins the amount of money wagered by each person who was eliminated in earlier rounds. A variant of the drinking game liar's dice known as Mexican or Mia uses similar dice rolls, but has very different game mechanics.

Equipment
The game requires two dice and a surface upon which to roll them. Ideally, this surface will have a barrier of some sort on at least one side, off of which to bounce the dice during rolling and to prevent spillage.

Play
At the start of play, all players wager a set amount of money, and at the end of each round, the player with the lowest roll puts a predetermined portion of that money into the pot. For instance, players might start out with twenty-five dollars each, having agreed in advance that each round will cost the loser of that round five dollars. The game ends when enough rounds have been played that only one player with any money remains, at which point the pot is his. Thus, following the above example, three players with five betting units of five dollars each might play a minimum of ten and a maximum of fourteen rounds before a winner emerges. 

Rolling order for the first round is determined by rolling one die, with the player rolling highest going first, followed by the player to his or her left, and so on until a full clockwise rotation has been completed. This marks the end of the round. At this point, whoever has rolled for the lowest result puts his or her portion of money into the pot, and another round begins. Regardless of who rolled last, the losing player becomes first to roll the dice on the following round. During regular play (i.e., when not rolling for lead spot), two dice are always used. 

The lead player can roll the dice up to three times, and the number of rolls he or she takes determines how many rolls subsequent players may take in that round. However, only the last result of a player’s turn counts as his or her final score for that turn, rather than the best result of two or three rolls. Thus, it is in the leader's interest not to roll the dice more than is necessary, as doing so will give opponents more opportunities to beat what might turn out to be a low result.

Scoring
Two dice are used, and on each roll their separate numerical values are combined into a two-digit number, assigning a tens-column value to the higher of the two dice and a ones-column value to the lower. Thus, a roll of 4-2 would translate into a result of forty-two, a roll of 4-5 would be fifty-four, a roll of 6-5 would be sixty-five, and so on. There are two exceptions to this ranking scheme. One is doubles, which are ranked extra-numerically (6-6 ranks highest, with 5-5 just below it, and so on down to 1-1), and are worth more than any mixed roll. Therefore, the highest possible numerical value would be sixty-five, which itself would rank just below 1-1. The other exception to the rule of numeric value is a roll of 2-1: This counts for a score of twenty-one, the "Mexico" roll after which the game is named, and which is unbeatable, ranking above 6-6. Thus, the lowest possible roll is thirty-one. (Those familiar with the dice game Mia will notice that scoring in the two games is nearly identical.)

Although there are thirty-six possible results for any roll of two dice, there are only twenty-one meaningful results in the game of Mexico, since some rolls are cancelled by others. For instance, while 6-5 and 5-6 are considered different results in a statistical sense, they both equal sixty-five in this game. The possible results of any roll, and the ways it can be made, are listed in ascending order as follows:

{| border="2" cellpadding="2" cellspacing="0" style="border: 3px #aaa solid; font-size: 95%;"
|- style="Background: #eee"
! Result !! Ways 
|-
| 31, 32 || 2 Ways
|-
| 41, 42, 43 || 2 Ways
|-
| 51, 52, 53, 54 || 2 Ways 
|-
| 61, 62, 63, 64, 65 || 2 Ways
|-
| any double || 1 Way
|-
| 21 ("Mexico") || 2 Ways
|}

Strategy and odds
There is a moderate amount of strategy involved in Mexico, thanks to the fact that the first player to roll determines the conditions of play on a given round by re-rolling up to twice if he or she isn’t satisfied with their initial result. On the other hand, if any subsequent player is satisfied with a particular roll, that player is not forced to roll as many times as the leading roller. Thus, any player can stop after the first roll if they like (or anytime before the maximum roll allotment), even if his or her result isn’t the highest yet rolled, which follows from the fact that in this game one is only concerned to avoid rolling lowest in a given turn. Accordingly, the worst thing someone can do as lead roller is roll three times, only to end up with a mediocre result. Therefore, unless one has rolled something very easy to beat, and unless the field of opponents is extremely narrow (particularly in the case in which only one opponent remains) it is best to satisfy oneself with an average or even slightly below-average single result. 

The odds against any particular non-double result are 17 to 1, and the odds against each double are 35 to 1. However, because of the game’s open rolling structure and idiosyncratic adding system, determining what is a good roll is somewhat counterintuitive, and the most important thing to know is the median result for a given roll (i.e., the result such that it is an even proposition whether the next roll is likely to beat it). The median first roll result, in terms of the likelihood of some other result beating it, is 54—not 62, although there are ten possible results above and below the latter—one of the game’s oddities. Thus, the main thing to be kept in mind on the first roll is where one stands in relation to 54. However, a good result on the first roll is entirely different from a good result on the second or third, with the median result becoming more and more difficult to attain on each reiteration: The median results for the second and third rolls are, respectively, 64 and 1-1 (double ones). 

Naturally, if one knows the likelihood that they will beat their own last roll by rolling again, they also know the likelihood that someone following them will do the same. For example, if a player were to roll a 52 and then stop, that player would be looking at approximately a 61% probability that the next person will roll something equal to or better than that in one try. In other words, their next opponent would be a 3-to-2 favorite to beat or tie them. However, if the first player were to decide to roll again, he or she would then need to roll a 62 on their second turn, or a 64 on their third to maintain even this mediocre statistical position. Another result of 52 on a second roll would raise the likelihood of losing to or tying an opponent with two chances to roll to roughly 85%. This is of course a terrible position to be in, and the lead roller would almost certainly roll a third time, which would, in turn, give opponents more chances to beat him or her. If the lead roller were sufficiently hapless as to come up with yet another result of 52 on the third roll, an opponent would have approximately a 95% likelihood of beating or tying that result in three attempts, making our first roller a 19-to-1 underdog for that round - just as if that player had rolled for the lowest possible result, a 31, and then stopped after just one roll.

Below is a statistical breakdown of all possible rolls and their likelihood of being beaten (but not tied), according to the number of attempts an opponent has to roll against them. The median rolls, depending on how many rolls have been taken, are in boldface text.

{|border="2" cellpadding="2" cellspacing="0" style="border: 3px #aaa solid; font-size: 95%;"
|- style="Background: #eee"
! Result (x)
! Likelihood:Any 1 roll > x
! Likelihood:Any 1 of 2 rolls > x
! Likelihood:Any 1 of 3 rolls > x
|-
| 31
| 94.44%
| 99.69%
| 99.98%
|-
| 32
| 88.89%
| 98.78%
| 99.86%
|-
| 41
| 83.33%
| 97.22%
| 99.54%
|-
| 42
| 77.78%
| 95.06%
| 98.90%
|-
| 43
| 72.22%
| 92.28%
| 97.86%
|-
| 51
| 66.67%
| 88.89%
| 96.30%
|-
| 52
| 61.11%
| 84.88%
| 94.12%
|-
| 53
| 55.56%
| 80.25%
| 91.22%
|-
| 54
| 50.00%
| 75.00%
| 87.50%
|-
| 61
| 44.44%
| 69.14%
| 82.85%
|-
| 62
| 38.89%
| 62.65%
| 77.18%
|-
| 63
| 33.33%
| 55.56%
| 70.37%
|-
| 64
| 27.78%
| 47.84%
| 62.33%
|-
| 65
| 22.22%
| 39.51%
| 52.95%
|-
| Double 1
| 19.44%
| 35.11%
| 47.73%
|-
| Double 2
| 16.67%
| 30.56%
| 42.13%
|-
| Double 3
| 13.89%
| 25.85%
| 36.15%
|-
| Double 4
| 11.11%
| 20.99%
| 29.77%
|-
| Double 5
| 8.33%
| 15.97%
| 22.97%
|-
| Double 6
| 5.56%
| 10.80%
| 15.76%
|-
| 21 ("Mexico")
| 0.00%
| 0.00%
| 0.00%
|}.

Coming up "Mexico"
Further complicating matters is the special status of the twenty-one—or "Mexico"—result. If the lead roller should achieve a result of twenty-one on any of that player's three allotted rolls, the dice pass immediately to the next player in line and the round proceeds as though that player were first to roll. In other words, the first roller is effectively out of danger of losing that round, and the second roller is given the option of rolling up to three times and setting the rolling limit for the remaining players. If the same thing happens again and the second roller (i.e., the new "lead" roller) succeeds in rolling "Mexico" in up to three attempts, then the third in line becomes the new "first," and so forth. If everyone except the last roller manages to roll "Mexico", then the last player is given three rolls to try to do the same; if that player fails he or she is required to feed the pot.

In addition to adjusting the advantage in the way just outlined, a "Mexico" roll doubles the stakes for that round, so that the round’s loser puts two betting units into the pot rather than one. As to the question of whether the stakes should continue to double—more properly speaking, whether they should quadruple, and then octuple, in relation to the original stake—if more than one person rolls "Mexico" in a single round: Generally speaking, this is not the case. However, for the sake of clarity and the smooth flow of play, this issue should always be decided before play begins. 

(Players trying to decide which way to go on this issue ought to keep in mind that the odds against two "Mexicos" in a row are 212 to 4 (or 53 to 1; roughly a 1.85% likelihood), and against three in a row are 1288 to 8 (or 161 to 1; roughly a 0.61% likelihood). These are long, but certainly not astronomical, odds. For the sake of context: The odds of rolling three "hardway" sixes or eights in a row in craps is 213 to 3 (roughly a 1.3% likelihood). Furthermore, these odds assume that each player is allowed only one roll; if "Mexico" is the final result of two or three rolls, the likelihood of duplicating it rises substantially, in the same way that the median roll for a given round changes, depending on how many rolls the leader takes.)

Finally, if anyone besides the leader rolls twenty-one when the leader has not already done so, the roll is not considered "Mexico", and play proceeds as usual, although the player in question has still rolled for an unbeatable (though still tieable) result.

Ties
Ties are only relevant if two or more players are tied for lowest place, and are therefore broken at the end of each round, since if many are playing, a tie early on may be a moot point by the time the round is over. Tie-breaking can be accomplished by having the tied parties play a "sub-round" of Mexico, with the loser of that round paying into the pot in the usual manner.

Dice games